The flying claw, flying talon or soft talon (Chinese: 飞爪; pinyin: fēi zhua) is used to ensnare a foe and throw them off balance. It originated in China during the Sui Dynasty and is one of the flexible or soft weapons in the Chinese martial arts. It features metal hand or claw on the end of a chain or rope. It is in the same family as the meteor hammer, rope dart, and chain whip.
  
It is designed to wrap, capture, entangle and grip. Some are more elaborate and the claw actually closes and tightens when the rope/chain is pulled. Those are constructed with a spring mechanism within the metal claw that allows the claw to open and close as the tether is pulled or released. Some of the latter can grab trees and rip off the bark.

The flying claw varies in reach and chain/rope length. Length of the chain or rope can be up to 15 meters.

Mace variant of the weapon existed, called iron claw (Chinese: 挝; tiē zhǎo), where the (opened) claw is not attached to a chain or rope but to a handle. It should not be confused with iron fist (Chinese: 鐵拳; pinyin: tiěquán) which has a closed claw or fist design for the head of the weapon.

In popular culture
The flying claw appear in the kung fu film Tiger & Crane Fists. The footage was later used in the comedy film Kung Pow! Enter the Fist.

See also
 Dragon beard hook

References

Chain and rope throwing weapons
Chinese martial arts
Chinese melee weapons